is a train station on the Kyoto Municipal Subway Karasuma Line and Tōzai Line in Nakagyo-ku, Kyoto, Japan.

Lines

 (Station Number: K08)
 (Station Number: T13)

Layout
The station is the transferring station operated by Kyoto Municipal Transportation Bureau under Karasuma Oike Intersection on Karasuma Street and Oike Street. The two side platforms with two tracks for the Karasuma Line are located under the ticket gate floor, and the island platform with two tracks for the Tōzai Line is located under the Karasuma Line.
Karasuma Line

Tōzai Line

Surroundings

 Ace Hotel Kyoto
 Adachi Hospital
 Hello Work Plaza Karasuma Oike
 Karasuma Oike Intersection
 Kyoto International Manga Museum
 The Museum of Kyoto
 Nakagyo-ku Post Office
 NHK Kyoto Broadcast Station
 Nichicon Corporation
 ShinPuhKan mall

History
May 29, 1981 - Oike Station was opened on the same day as the opening of the Kyoto Subway Karasuma Line from Kitaoji to Kyoto.
August 28, 1988 - Through service to and from the Kintetsu Kyoto Line started.
May 22, 1997 - Oike Station was renamed Karasuma-Oike Station to prepare to connect to the Tozai Line from Daigo to Nijo.
October 12, 1997 - The Tozai Line was opened.
April 1, 2007 - PiTaPa service started.
January 16, 2008 - Through service to and from the Keihan Railway Keishin Line started on the same day as the extension of the Tozai Line from Nijo to Uzumasa Tenjingawa.
May 16, 2011 - Underground shopping area Kotochika Oike opened.

References

Railway stations in Japan opened in 1981
Railway stations in Kyoto Prefecture